Rakesh Pandey (born 9 April 1940)  is an Indian actor in Hindi and Bhojpuri movies. He has appeared in TV serials such as Chotti Bahu and Dehleez. He is an alumnus of the Indian Film and Television Institute, Pune.

Early life 
Born in Ambala Haryana, Rakesh graduated from Shamsher High School Nahan in 1961. He is a graduate of Bhartendu Academy of Dramatic Arts. In 1966, he left the Indian Film and Television Institute and joined the IPTA. His film debut came in 1969 in Sara Akash, based on the novel by Rajendra Yadav, and directed by Basu Chatterjee. He was awarded the President's Award. As a Bhojpuri actor, he received the fourth Bhojpuri Film Award for Lifetime Achievement. He acted in the first Bhojpuri TV serial Sanchi Piritia.

Filmography

Films 

Malik Ek (2010) as Collector Sahib
Staying Alive (2007) as Pandey
Indian (2001)... Raw Chief
Dil Chahta Hai (2001)
Hasina Dacait (2001)
Champion (2000) as Mukhtar Ahmed
Brij Kau Birju (1999) Brajbhasha dialect
Sar Kati Laash (1999)
Bhishma (1996)
Taqdeerwala (1995) as Suraj's dad
Beta Ho To Aisa (1994)
Gopalaa (1994)
Santaan (1994) Defence Lawyer
The Melody of Love (1993)
Adharm (1992) as Bharat Verma
Mehboob Mere Mehboob (1992) as Ranjha's brother
Eeshwar (1989)
Chintamani Surdas (1988)
Jawani Ki Lahren (1988)
108 Teerthyatra (1987) as Rajkumar Uttam Kumar
Zevar (1987) as Gagan
Yudh (1985) as Rahim
Bhaiya Dooj (1984) as Mohan
Chandani Bani Chudel (1984)
Maya Bazaar (1984/II) as Shri Krishna
Paanchwin Manzil (1983)
Apradhi Kaun? (1982)
Sant Gyaneshwar (1982)
Mahabali Hanuman (1981) as Shri Ram
Nai Imarat (1981)
Abdullah (1980) as Yashoda's husband
Gori Dian Jhanjran (1980) as Choudhary
Manzil (1979) as Prakash Mariwalla
Balam Pardesia (1979)
Mera Rakshak (1978) as Mangal
Darwaza (1978)
Toote Khilone (1978)
Yehi Hai Zindagi (1977)
Zindagi (1976) as Ramesh R. Shukla
Aarambh (1976)
Jeevan Jyoti (1976) as Harbhans
Andolan (1975)
Apne Dushman (1975) as Singh
Himalay Se Ooncha (1975) as Captain George
Mutthi Bhar Chawal (1975)
Zindagi Aur Toofan (1975)
Ek Gaon ki Kahani (1975)
Do Chattane (1974) as Ramzan
Shatranj Ke Mohre (1974)
Shikwa (1974)
Ujala Hi Ujala (1974) as Ajit
Woh Main Nahin (1974)
Dil Ki Rahen (1973)
Haathi Ke Daant (1973)
Intezaar (1973)
Kunwara Badan (1973)
Amar Prem (1972) as Anand Babu's Brother-in-law
Anokha Daan (1972)
Man Jaiye (1972) as Ajay Sharma
Rakhwala (1971) (as Rakesh Panday) as Suresh
Do Raha (1971)
Sara Akash (1969) (as Rakesh) as Samar Thakur

Serials 
Jaat Ki Jugni (2017) as Khazan Singh Dahiya
Dehleez (2009)
Chotti Bahu (2008)
Aek Chabhi Hai Padoss Mein (2006)
Pyaar Ke Do Naam: Ek Raadha, Ek Shyaam (2006) TV series as Brijkishore - Raadha's father
Devi (2003) TV series
Shaktimaan (2002) as Pandit Vidhadhar Shastri - Shatimaan's adoptive father
Kahkashaan (1992) as Majaz Lucknowi - Urdu poet
Saans (1999) TV mini-series
Aakhri Chaal (1985) (TV)
 2002 Ghar Sansaar as Shashikant

References

External links

Indian male film actors
1940 births
Living people
Male actors in Bhojpuri cinema
Film and Television Institute of India alumni
Male actors in Hindi cinema
Indian male television actors
Male actors from Himachal Pradesh
20th-century Indian male actors
21st-century Indian male actors
People from Sirmaur district
Actors from Mumbai